Sevan Malikyan (born September 4, 1972 in London) is British expressive artist of Armenian ancestry.

Career 
Sevan Malikyan was born in 1972 in London. Sevan's father, Kevork Malikyan (born in June, 1943), is an Anglo-Armenian actor from Diyarbakır, Turkey. He went on to the U.K. in 1963 with a drama scholarship and studied at Rose Bruford Drama School. Sevan's mother Maida Malikyan (born in August, 1947) from Nicosia, Cyprus, went to the U.K. in 1959 and went to become a hair stylist in London where they met.

A studio based painter, Sevan is considered one of the young outstanding artists of his generation with many exhibitions. Sevan got his Art education in London, he gained a BA (Hons) in Fine Art from the Bath School of Art and Design. Later he studied at the Cyprus College of Art, completing his postgraduate Diploma in Fine Art in 2009 and a post 16 Adult teaching diploma. Since 2010 Sevan has been an adult education painting tutor at Cornaro Art Institute.

Sevan Malikyan's works can be found in private collections of Cyprus, Sweden, Italy, Turkey and the U.K.

Exhibitions 
 Riverside Studios, Brick Lane Gallery and Mall Galleries, London (shortlisted for the Diana Brooks Prize)
 Fine Art Company Inc London, Group Show Selected Works, 2005
 Brick Lane Gallery London, Group Show Figurative paintings, 2006
 Fine Art Company Inc London, Group Show Selected Works, 2007
 Aspelia Gallery, Larnaka, 2008  
 “Painting within”, Kypriaki Gonia Gallery, Larnaka, 2011
 Passage Through Abstraction, Gloria Gallery, Nicosia, 2014
 Cornaro Art Institute, New paintings, Larnaka, 2016

See also
List of Armenian artists
Armenians in the UK

References

External links
 Sevan Malikyan
 SEVAN MALIKYAN, Nude in Crimson Hat

1972 births
Armenian painters
Painters from London
Living people
British people of Armenian descent
Alumni of Bath School of Art and Design